The Tüttensee (Lake Tütten) is a small lake in the Chiemgau region, the Bavarian Alpine foothills of the Traunstein district, within the municipalities of Grabenstätt and Vachendorf.

The lake is partly surrounded by well preserved Kame terraces and drains to the north west into the tiny Marwanger Creek to the Chiemsee. At the southern lake shore is a small public beach with an Inn and further amenities. It is one of the warmest lakes in Upper Bavaria.

Recent geological and biological research showed that the Tüttensee has an undisturbed profile of peat bog since the Würm glaciation and over more than 12.500 years since.

The recent dating of the undisturbed peak horizons refuted claims by amateur geologists, that the Tüttensee was the result of a hypothetical meteor impact within the last 4000 years.

References 

Lakes of Bavaria
Kames
Glacial landforms
Ponds of Europe
Kettle lakes in Germany